Nepean FC are a semi-professional football (soccer) club, from the Penrith and St Marys suburbs in Western Sydney. The club was founded in 2011. The Men's team currently plays in the NSW State League, the fourth tier of football in New South Wales and the fifth tier in Australia when including the national competition, the A-League.

History
The area has been previously represented by a number of clubs, most recently Penrith Nepean United who folded in 2009 whilst competing in the NSW Premier League.

In the absence of representative football in the Penrith area, the Nepean District Soccer Football Association, (now Nepean Football Association) set out to create a club and a pathway for local footballers to play at a representative level.

Nepean FC were the hosts and opponents of new A-League club Western Sydney Wanderers first ever match. The match took place at Cook Park in front of more than 3500 spectators. Nepean FC lost the match 5–0 with Joey Gibbs grabbing four goals.

Despite finishing last in State League Division 2 in 2012, Nepean FC were placed in State League Division 1 for 2013 when Football NSW undertook a significant restructure of the league system to meet the criteria of the nationally implemented National Premier Leagues.

In 2014 the Women's team recorded Nepean FC's best result to date by winning the Women's State League and securing promotion to the 2015 National Premier Leagues Division 2.

Teams
Nepean FC as a club comprises:
 2 men’s teams (1st Grade and U20s) in NSW National Premier League Four
 5 female teams entered in the National Premier League's NSW Women's Division 2  (1st Grade & Reserve Grade)
 9 boy's teams (National Premier Leagues Division 2 Youth U13 ~ U18; Association Youth League U13 ~ U16)
 3 female teams (National Premier Leagues Division 2 Girls Youth U13 ~ U16)
 8 teams in Association Youth League Skills Acquisition Program: SAP (Boys - U9 ~ U12) & GSAP (Girls - U10 ~ U13).

Club Colours, Logo and Kit
The club's shirt is predominantly red with a large white stripe running vertically on the left. The shorts and socks are red. Nepean FC is administered by the Nepean Football Association, which has clubs from four council areas, City of Penrith, City of Blue Mountains, City of Hawkesbury and Wollondilly Shire. Hence the logo represents the three significant geographical symbols of these regions, the mountains and the 2 rivers of the Nepean and Hawkesbury.

Seasons

Men's League

Men's Cup

Women's League

Notes

References

External links
 Club Website

Soccer clubs in Sydney
Association football clubs established in 2011